Tukwini Mandela (born 1 Dec 1974) is a South African advertising executive and a co-founder of the House of Mandela Foundation.

She is the granddaughter of Nelson Mandela and his first wife Evelyn Mase.

Early life and education

Tukwini Mandela was born in the Eastern Cape in December 1974. She is the oldest child of Makaziwe Mandela and has three siblings Dumani, Kweku, and Adjoa. While her mother was away studying at university, Tukwini, along with her siblings and many cousins, was raised by her grandmother Evelyn until age 10. In 1985, shortly before her 11th birthday, she moved with her mother, father, and siblings to the US as her parents had received scholarships to further their studies. Living in the US was challenging for Tukwini and her brother Dumani, as they spoke no English. After matriculating from Amherst High School, Tukwini joined her mother in Kenya and lived there for six months. She finally returned home to South Africa in 1994, obtaining her degree in Social Work at Wits University and a certificate in Account Management from the AAA School of Advertising.

Career
Tukwini went on to work for two advertising agencies, Leo Burnett and Foote Cone and Belding, where she managed accounts such as Coca-Cola, Procter & Gamble, Sasol, and Kellogg's, later joining the First National Bank as a Communications Consultant in the Advertising Unit, where she advised internal clients on marketing and communication strategies, project management, management of budgets, development of advertising campaigns, and the development of the Advertising Department's operating processes. Together with her mother Makaziwe Mandela, she founded the House of Mandela Foundation in 2010.

References

1953 births
Living people
South African businesspeople
Makaziwe
University of Massachusetts Amherst College of Social and Behavioral Sciences alumni
University of Fort Hare alumni
Waterford Kamhlaba alumni
People educated at a United World College